Sanjaykaka Ramchandra Patil is a politician from Tasgaon of Sangli district of Maharashtra state in India. He was Vice President of Sangli Municipal Corporation and President of Indian Youth Congress in Sangli district. In 1996, he was the member of Zila Parishad, Sangli. He was arranging the fronts against Government for the farmers problems in Sangli district. He is also the President of Shri Ganapati Jilha Krushi Audyogik Sarv Seva Sahkari Society, Sangli. He was former President of Annasaheb M. K. Patil Arthik Vikas Mahamandal, Maharashtra.

He was member of Legislative Council of Maharashtra from Nationalist Congress Party (NCP). He is present Member of Parliament for Sangli Lok Sabha constituency. He was competing with NCP Leader R. R. Patil for Tasgaon - Kavathe-Mahankal Legislative Assembly. He loss the election of MLA in Tasgaon Kavathe Mahankal Assembly by few votes. In February 2014 he quit NCP and joined Bharatiya Janata Party. He contested Sangli seat in Indian general elections in 2014 as BJP / NDA candidate and won the election with the majority of 238,000 votes. He defeated the Indian National Congress leader Pratik Patil.

'Sangli First-Beyond the horizon' is an ambitious project for Sangli district.

References

Members of the Maharashtra Legislative Council
People from Sangli
India MPs 2014–2019
India MPs 2019–present
Living people
Lok Sabha members from Maharashtra
Bharatiya Janata Party politicians from Maharashtra
Marathi politicians
Nationalist Congress Party politicians from Maharashtra
Indian National Congress politicians
1965 births